DeBerry or Deberry is a surname. Notable people with the surname include:

Allie DeBerry (born 1994), American actress and model
Clifton DeBerry (1924–2006), American communist
Coreontae DeBerry (born 1994), American basketball player
Edmund Deberry (1787–1859), American politician
Fisher DeBerry (born 1938), American football player and coach
Hank DeBerry (1894–1951), American baseball player
Jim DeBerry (born 1977), American businessman and comedian
Joe DeBerry (1896–1944), American baseball player
John DeBerry (born 1951), American politician
Lois DeBerry (1945–2013), American politician
Virginia DeBerry, American writer